Custody is a 1988 Australian TV docudrama about a child custody battle. It was filmed over three weeks in a semi-improvisational style.

References

External links

Complete copy of film at A Place to Think

Australian television films
1988 television films
1988 films
1980s English-language films